Vadym Anatolyovich Yevtushenko (born 1 January 1958) is a Ukrainian professional footballer who played as a midfielder or striker.

Career
During his career he played almost exclusively for Dynamo Kyiv. He earned 12 caps for the USSR national team and was included in the squads for the 1982 (he did not play in any games there) and 1986 World Cups. He scored his only goal for USSR on 26 July 1983 in a friendly against East Germany. He scored a goal as Dynamo Kyiv won the 1986 European Cup Winners' Cup Final.

In the late 1980s Yevtushenko moved to Sweden and became Swedish champion with AIK in 1992. After concluding his playing career in Sweden at IK Sirius two years later, he remained in Swedish football as first an assistant and then head coach for longer than a decade before moving back to Ukrainian football after 2008.

Personal life
His son, Vyacheslav Yevtushenko played for AIK in early 2000s.

Another son Vadim Jevtusheenko played for Vasalunds IF.

Honours
 Soviet Top League: 1980, 1981, 1985, 1986, 1988
 Soviet Cup: 1982, 1985, 1987, 1989
 Cup Winners Cup: 1986
 Swedish League: 1992

External links
https://web.archive.org/web/20070825194046/http://www.valstasyrianska.nu/html/ateam.asp?playerID=49
https://www.arlandafotboll.se/news/6795528?firstRef

1958 births
Living people
People from Dnipropetrovsk Oblast
Ukrainian footballers
Soviet footballers
Soviet expatriate footballers
Soviet expatriate sportspeople in Sweden
Ukrainian expatriate footballers
Expatriate footballers in Sweden
FC Zirka Kropyvnytskyi players
FC Dynamo Kyiv players
FC Dnipro players
AIK Fotboll players
Soviet Top League players
Allsvenskan players
1982 FIFA World Cup players
1986 FIFA World Cup players
Soviet Union international footballers
Ukrainian Premier League managers
FC Zirka Kropyvnytskyi managers
FC Vorskla Poltava managers
FC Dynamo-2 Kyiv managers
IK Sirius Fotboll players
Hammarby Fotboll non-playing staff
Association football midfielders
Association football forwards
Ukrainian football managers
FC Cherkashchyna managers
FC Krystal Kherson managers
Ukrainian expatriate sportspeople in Sweden
Recipients of the Order of Merit (Ukraine), 3rd class
Sportspeople from Dnipropetrovsk Oblast